Ed Caluag is a Filipino paranormal investigator and spiritistic field expert and researcher who appeared on various television shows such as Kapuso Mo, Jessica Soho, Tunay na Buhay and Magpakailanman. He is also a guest on different paranormal radio shows.

Early life and education 
Caluag was born in Malolos, Bulacan. He suffered from polio when he was only 7 years old. He is a graduate of Bachelor of Elementary Education and a licensed professional teacher.

Career 
Caluag became a household name after his various guesting stints in Kapuso Mo, Jessica Soho (KMJS) as a resource person on paranormal activities. Some of these segments include “Bato-Bato Sa Langit,” “Manila City Hall” (Gabi Ng Lagim VI), and “Palaka”. But it was not always a case of positive feedback. Caluag received negative reception online for the episode "Ghost Ship", where KMJS investigated a mysterious ship in Siquijor. This was due to his paranormal observations not coinciding with scientific and factual findings which was also featured in the same episode of KMJS.

Personal life 
He is married to his wife Marilyn Laluan-Caluag.

References 

Living people
Year of birth missing (living people)
Paranormal investigators
Filipino educators